The 1965 Daytona 500, the 7th running of the event, was held on February 14, 1965 at Daytona International Speedway in Daytona Beach, Florida. Fred Lorenzen, driving a 1965 Ford, won the race from fourth position in a two-hour-and-23-minute time span by Darel Dieringer by a full lap. There were 3 cautions flags which slowed the race for 43 laps.  The race ended on lap 133 due to persistent rain. This was Lorenzen's first victory of the season.

Safety innovations
NASCAR instituted new rules in October 1964 to enhance safety and decrease speeds for 1965 after the previous year's deaths of Joe Weatherly and Fireball Roberts. The Chrysler Hemi engine was dominated that year by 1964 NASCAR Champion Richard Petty.

Ford Motor Company wanted a new engine with high-rise cylinder heads to compete with the Hemi and threatened to pull out if Bill France Sr. didn't allow it. NASCAR's new rules, however, banned both Hemi engines and high-rise cylinder heads.

Speedweeks
Lorenzen took the lead on lap 39. But when he roared under the white flag, he mistook it for the checkered flag. Lorenzen let off and Johnson passed him on the last lap to win. The second qualifying race featured a wild first lap crash as Ron Eulenfeld triggered a wild crash that also took out 12 other cars in the race. Eulenfeld walked away from that crash.

Race Day
On Race day, Junior Johnson grabbed the lead on the first lap from his second starting spot and led the first 27 laps. at that car 14 cars were out all because of mechanical problems. Johnson was racing in his usual go-for-broke style when a tire blew. Johnson's car hurled into the outside wall and spread debris over a wide area. Johnson suffered only a cut over his eye. After Johnson's abrupt departure, 1961 winner Marvin Panch led through lap 68 in the Wood Brothers Ford, with Lorenzen and Bobby Johns on his tail. Lorenzen led laps 69 through 78 before giving way to Panch.

At halfway, Panch was still in control, but clouds were darkening over the track. On lap 119, Lorenzen edged past Panch and took the lead for only the second time. Rain was falling by Lap 129. As the yellow light came on, Panch made a run on Lorenzen coming off turn two. Panch went to the outside, Lorenzen moved up, the cars touched and Panch spun down the backstretch, ending his chances for a second 500 victory.

Lorenzen remained in the lead, but the fender that had hit Panch's car was bent in on his tire. "Stay out" ordered crew chief Herb Nab, who was counting on the weather to shorten the race. Soon, it was pouring. the race was stopped after 133 laps and declared official. the Golden Boy had won NASCAR's biggest race.

References 

Daytona 500
Daytona 500
Daytona 500
NASCAR races at Daytona International Speedway